The Diocese of Bosa was a Roman Catholic diocese in Sardinia that was founded in 1612 and merged into the diocese of Alghero-Bosa in 1986.

It is asserted by some that the see was originally at Calmedia, but was transferred to Bosa after the destruction of the former town; also, that the first bishop was Saint Emilius, sent thither by Saint Peter and martyred in 70 AD but there is no historical evidence.

Pope Gregory the Great, in one of his letters, speaks of a Bishop of Bosa, without mentioning the bishop's name. In 1073 Costantino de Castro, Bishop of Bosa, who according to an inscription had built Bosa Cathedral, dedicated to Saint Peter, was appointed Metropolitan of Torres by Gregory VII. Among the most illustrious bishops of this see are numbered the learned Cardinal Giovanni Casanova (1424); G. Francesco Fara (1591), author of the first (but very inaccurate) history of Sardinia; and Serafino Esquirro, a learned theologian, who had been General of the Servites (1677).

Ordinaries

Diocese of Bosa
Erected: 5th Century
Latin name: Bosanensis
Metropolitan: Archdiocese of Sassari

Giuliano de Tallada, O.P. (1435–1445 Died) 
Giovanni Cossa, O.P. (1450–1459 Died) 
Jean de Salinis, O.F.M. (1471–1483 Died) 
Giovanni di Sorra (1516–) 
Bernardo Gentile, O.P. (1532–1537 Died) 
Nicolás de Aragón (1537–1541 Died) 
Baltasar de Heredia, O.P. (1541–1548 Appointed, Archbishop of Cagliari) 
Vincenzo de Leone, O. Carm. (1548–1556 Died) 
Antonio Pintor Cavaro (1556–1572 Died) 
Giovanni Melis, O.F.M. Conv. (1572–1575 Died) 
Juan Sena, O.S.A. (1575–1577 Died) 
Nicola Canyelles (1577–1586 Died) 
José Anglés, O.F.M. (1586–1588 Died) 
Jerónimo Garcia, O.SS.T. (1588–1590 Died) 
Antonio Atzori (1592–1605 Died)
Gavino Manca de Cedrelles (1605–1612 Appointed, Bishop of Alghero)  
Juan Alvarez Zapata, O. Cist. (1612–1613 Appointed, Bishop of Solsona)  
Giovanni Battista de Aquena (1613–1615 Died) 
Vincenzo Bacallar (bishop) (1615–1625 Died)  
Giovanni Atzori (1625–1627 Died) 
Sebastiano Carta (1627–1631 Died)  
Melchiorre Pirella (1631–1635 Appointed, Bishop of Ales e Terralba)  
Giovanni Maria Olmo (1635–1639 Died)  
Vicente Agustín Clavería (1639–1644 Appointed, Bishop of Alghero)  
Gaspare Litago (1645–1652 Appointed, Bishop of Ampurias e Civita)  
Francisco Camps de la Carrera y Molés (1654–1657 Died)
Giacomo Capay y Castagner (1658–1663 Died)  
Gavino Cattayna, O. Carm. (1663–1671 Confirmed, Archbishop of Sassari)  
Francisco López de Urraca, O.S.A. (1672–1677 Appointed, Bishop of Alghero) 
Serafino Esquirro (1677–1680 Confirmed, Bishop of Ales e Terralba) 
Giorgio Sotgia (Soggia), O.S.M. (1682–1701 Died) 
Gavino di Aquena (1702–1723 Died) 
Nicola Cani, O.P. (1727–1737 Died) 
Giovanni Leonardo Sanna (1737–1741 Died) 
Francesco Bernardo de Cespedes (1742–1746 Died) 
Antonio Amat (1746–1748 Died) 
Giovanni Battista Machín Espiga (1748–1749 Died) 
Raimondo Quesada (1750–1758 Died) 
Giuseppe Stanislao Concas (1759–1763 Died) 
Giovanni Antonio Borro (1763–1767 Died) 
Giovanni Battista Quasina (1768–1785 Died) 
Giovanni Antonio Cossu, O.S.M. (1785–1796 Died) 
Gavino Murro (1800–1819 Confirmed, Archbishop of Sassari) 
Francesco Maria Tola (1823–1843 Died) 
Antonio Uda (1845–1845 Died) 
Eugenio Cano (1871–1905 Resigned) 
Giovanni Battista Vinati (1906–1916 Resigned) 
Angelico Antonio Zannetti, O.F.M. (1916–1926 Died) 
Filippo Mantini (1926–1931 Appointed, Bishop of Cagli e Pergola) 
Nicolò Frazioli (1931–1956 Died) 
Francesco Spanedda (1956–1979 Appointed, Archbishop of Oristano) 
Giovanni Pes (1979–1986 Appointed, Bishop of Alghero-Bosa)

30 September 1986: United with the Diocese of Alghero to form the Diocese of Alghero-Bosa

References

External links
 GCatholic.org

Former Roman Catholic dioceses in Italy
Roman Catholic dioceses in Sardinia
Religious organizations established in the 1610s
1612 establishments in Italy
Dioceses established in the 17th century
1926 disestablishments in Italy
Bosa